The enzyme L-arabinonolactonase (EC 3.1.1.15) catalyzes the reaction

L-arabinono-1,4-lactone + H2O  L-arabinonate

This enzyme belongs to the family of hydrolases, specifically those acting on carboxylic ester bonds.  The systematic name is L-arabinono-1,4-lactone lactonohydrolase. This enzyme participates in ascorbate and aldarate metabolism.

References 

 

EC 3.1.1
Enzymes of unknown structure